The Oxyporinae are a subfamily of the Staphylinidae discovered in 1839 by Erichson. One genus, Oxyporus Fabricius, with 132 species, is found worldwide.

Anatomy
All Oxyporinae have prominent mandibles. Their apical labial palpomeres are very large and strongly securiform. Their tarsi, like most Staphylinidae, are 5-5-5.

Ecology
Most Oxyporinae are fungivores. Their whole lifecycle involves fungi, as females construct egg-laying chambers in fungi and reproduce in them. Thus, most scientists inspect mushrooms and fleshy fungi to find these creatures.

References

External links
Oxyporinae at Bugguide.net. 

Staphylinidae
Beetles described in 1839
Beetles of North America
Beetle subfamilies